Jeremiah Markland (18 October (or 29) 1693 – 7 July 1776) was an English classical scholar.

Life
He was born in Childwall in Lancashire (now Liverpool) on 29 (or 18) October 1693. 
He was educated at Christ's Hospital and Peterhouse, Cambridge.

He left Cambridge in 1728 to act as private tutor to the son of W. Strode of Punsbourn, Hertfordshire, returning to the university in 1733. 
At a later date he lived at Twyford, and in 1744 went to Uckfield, Sussex, in order to superintend the education of the son of his former pupil, Mr. Strode. 
In 1752 he fixed his abode at Milton Court, near Dorking, Surrey, and remained there, living in great privacy, to the end of his days.

He died in Milton, near Dorking.

Works
His most important works are
 Epistola critica: ad ... Franciscum Hare ... in qua Horatii loca aliquot et aliorum veterum emendantur (1723)
 the Sylvae of Statius (1728)
 notes to the editions of Lysias by Taylor, of Maximus of Tyre by Davies, of Euripides's Hippolytus by Musgrave
 editions of Euripides's Supplices, Iphigenia in Tauride and in Aulide (ed. T. Gaisford 1811)
 Remarks on the Epistles of Cicero to Brutus, and of Brutus to Cicero (1745).

References

Attribution

Sources
 John Nichols, Literary Anecdotes (1812), iv. 272
 biography by Friedrich August Wolf, Literarische Analekten, ii. 370 (1818)
 

1693 births
1776 deaths
People educated at Christ's Hospital
Alumni of Peterhouse, Cambridge
Academics from Liverpool
English classical scholars
18th-century English people
English male writers
People from Childwall